Andy Bird CBE is a British executive. He was chairman of Walt Disney International until 2018. Bird is the current CEO of Pearson Education.

Early life 
Bird grew up in Warrington, England and was educated at King's School, Macclesfield.  In 1985, Bird gained a Bachelor of Arts degree in English language and literature at Newcastle University.

Career
Bird first started his career in broadcasting as one of Timmy Mallett's helpers on Manchester's Piccadilly Radio. He later produced the breakfast show. He later moved to London working for Richard Branson's Virgin Broadcasting, working on their music television channel Music Box and satellite radio station 'Radio Radio'. Next was British Satellite Broadcasting's The Power Station channel.

In 1990, Bird and Chris Evans formed company Big and Good that made programmes for TVam.

Bird joined Time Warner in 1994 as senior vice president and general manager of Turner Entertainment Networks Limited. In 2000, he became president of TBS International and was responsible for all TBS broadcasting outside of the United States.

Disney
In 2004, Bird joined The Walt Disney Company and has since overseen the acquisition of Hungama TV in India and investment in India's UTV. He also localizes content and has reorganized Disney's international structure and leadership ranks.

Bird was appointed Commander of the Most Excellent Order of the British Empire (CBE) in the 2012 Birthday Honours for services to UK media and entertainment.

Pearson
Bird was selected as CEO of Pearson plc to replace the retiring John Fallon and has been with the company since October 2020.

References 

Living people
Disney people
Alumni of Newcastle University
People from Warrington
Commanders of the Order of the British Empire
Place of birth missing (living people)
Year of birth missing (living people)